Kenneth John George is a British oceanographer, poet, and linguist. He is noted as being the originator of Kernewek Kemmyn, an orthography for the revived Cornish language which he claims is more faithful to Middle Cornish phonology than its precursor, (Unified Cornish).

George has published over eighty items relating to Celtic linguistics, including several dictionaries of Cornish. His edition of the newly discovered Middle Cornish play  was published by the Cornish Language Board in May 2006. George received a Commendation for this work in the 2007 Holyer an Gof awards. He has translated numerous hymns and songs into Cornish, and also the lyrics of The Magic Flute. He has composed a substantial amount of poetry in Cornish, including the full-length play , in the style of the Ordinalia.

George lives in Cornwall. As well as English, he speaks Breton, French and Cornish. George was formerly Principal Lecturer in Ocean Science in the Institute of Marine Studies at the University of Plymouth.

George was made a Bard of Gorsedh Kernow in 1979, taking the Bardic name  ('Tide Predictor'). This reflected one of his research interests in oceanography, the other being numerical modelling. He has over fifty publications in the oceanographic field, including the textbook Tides for Marine Studies, which has sold over 1000 copies.

George is a Gorsedh Kernow representative committee member of the Kesva an Taves Kernewek (Cornish Language Board) which is a body promoting the Cornish language.

George took early retirement in 2006, and has since been learning Japanese.

References 

Academics of the University of Plymouth
Bards of Gorsedh Kernow
British male dramatists and playwrights
British male poets
British oceanographers
Breton-speaking people
Cornish language activists
Cornish-language writers
Cornish-speaking people
Celtic studies scholars
Cornish nationalists
Dramatists and playwrights from Cornwall
Poets from Cornwall
Linguists from the United Kingdom
Living people
1947 births